Smiths Island is an island in Plum Creek, next to Lake Erie. It is in Monroe County, in southeast Michigan.

See also
Foleys Island
Kauslers Island

References

Islands of Monroe County, Michigan